Serango is a village in Gumma tehsil, Gajapati district, Odisha state, India. It is close to Mahendragiri, one of the highest mountain peaks in the state.

Brief history
Serango is where Canadian Baptist Missionaries began their work in the region during the early 20th century. Their monument, Bethany Bungalow, still there today. They also established a mission hospital, that is, the CBM Serango Christian Hospital, that continues to serve the need for those in medical need and it was their first such enterprise. One branch is operating near Paralakhemundi, that is, the CBM Eye Services, Ranipeta.  They also started an orphanage here.

It is also the centre for the development of Soura literature because the missionaries had the Bible translated into that languages as a means of propagating their beliefs.

Education
Serango has two primary schools, being Serango Government High School and Jisu Prem English School.

There are no other educational facilities but nearby colleges include:

 Centurion School Of Rural Enterprise Management
 S.k.C.G College
 Jagannath Institute For Technology And Management
 Meena Ketan Degree College

References

Gajapati district